The Dark Tower: The Drawing of the Three - The Sailor is a five-issue comic book limited series published by Marvel Comics. It is the fifteenth comic book miniseries based on Stephen King's The Dark Tower series of novels. It is plotted by Robin Furth, scripted by Peter David, and illustrated by Juanan Ramirez with Cory Hamscher and Jesus Aburtov with Federico Blee, with covers by Jay Anacleto and Romulo Fajardo Jr. Stephen King is the Creative and Executive Director of the project. The first issue was published on October 12, 2016.

Publication dates
Issue #1: October 12, 2016
Issue #2: November 9, 2016
Issue #3: December 14, 2016
Issue #4: January 11, 2017
Issue #5: February 8, 2017

Collected editions
The entire five-issue run of The Sailor was collected into a paperback edition, released by Marvel on May 9, 2017.

See also
The Dark Tower (comics)

References

External links

Dark Tower Official Site

2016 comics debuts
Drawing of the Three - The Sailor, The